This list of tunnels in Canada includes any road, rail or waterway tunnel in Canada.

Alberta
 97 Avenue Tunnel, Edmonton, under Alberta Legislature Grounds
Airport Tunnel, Calgary under Calgary International Airport
Edmonton Radial Railway Society Tunnel (Old CPR Rail Tunnel), Edmonton under 109 Street.

British Columbia
Road tunnels:
Cassiar Tunnel, Vancouver
Elko Tunnel, near Fernie
Fraser Canyon Tunnels
Saddle Rock Tunnel
Sailor Bar Tunnel
Hell's Gate
China Bar Tunnel
Yale Tunnel
Alexandra Tunnel
Ferrabee Tunnel
George Massey Tunnel, Vancouver
Iron Gates Tunnel, near Radium Hot Springs

Railway tunnels:
Big Hill Spiral Tunnels
Bulldog Tunnel, West Kootenay
Connaught Tunnel, under Selkirk Mountains 
Dunsmuir Tunnel, Vancouver
Esquimalt and Nanaimo Railway Tunnel, located between Langford and Malahat
Lonsdale Tunnel, Vancouver
Mount Macdonald Tunnel, near Rogers Pass
Quintette Tunnels, near Hope
Thornton Tunnel, Burnaby

Various tunnel sections of Canada Line
Tunnel section of the Evergreen Extension between Burquitlam and Port Moody stations

Ontario

Vehicular tunnels:
The "Airport Tunnel" (Basketweave), Mississauga
Brockville Tunnel
Detroit-Windsor Tunnel, Windsor
Cst. Robert C. Carrick and Sr. Cst. John Atkinson Memorial Tunnels, Windsor
Highway 404-401 Interchange Tunnel, Toronto
Main Street Tunnel, Welland
Michigan Central Railway Tunnel, Windsor
Simcoe Street Tunnel, Toronto
St. Clair Tunnel
Thorold Tunnel
Townline Tunnel

Pedestrian tunnels:
 Pedestrian tunnel at Billy Bishop Toronto City Airport
 An extensive system of tunnels links the buildings of Carleton University
 Pedestrian tunnels connecting various buildings at York University
 Pedestrian tunnel connecting Spadina (TTC) stations.
 The PATH in Downtown Toronto.

Quebec
Road tunnels:
Airport Tunnel, Montreal under Montréal–Trudeau International Airport
Atwater Tunnel, Montreal
Dufferin–Champlain Tunnel, Quebec City
Joseph Samson Bridge–Tunnel, Quebec City
Louis Hippolyte Lafontaine Bridge–Tunnel, Montreal
Melocheville Tunnel, Beauharnois
Notre-Dame-de-Grâce Tunnel, Montreal
Robert Bourassa Tunnel, Quebec City
Rue St.-Marc and Rue du Fort tunnels, Montreal
Saint-Rémi Tunnel, Montreal
Saint-Nicolas Tunnel, near Franquelin
Soulanges Canal Tunnel, Les Cèdres
Ville-Marie and Viger Tunnels, Montreal
Wellington Street Tunnel, Montreal

Railway tunnels:
Mount Royal Tunnel, Montreal
Wolfe’s Cove Tunnel, Quebec City

Pedestrian tunnels:
 The Underground City (RÉSO)
 Tunnels of Laval University

See also
List of tunnels by location

References

Canada
 
Tunnels
Tunnels